Gonzalo Javier Yordan (born 20 March 1994) is an Argentine footballer who plays for Ferro de General Pico.

References

External links
 Profile at Vélez Sarsfield's official website 

1994 births
Living people
Argentine footballers
Association football goalkeepers
Sportspeople from Córdoba Province, Argentina
Club Atlético Vélez Sarsfield footballers
UAI Urquiza players
Estudiantes de Buenos Aires footballers
Argentine Primera División players
Primera B Metropolitana players